Forget Me Not is a 1936 British musical drama film directed by Zoltan Korda and starring Beniamino Gigli, Joan Gardner and Ivan Brandt. In the United States, it was released under the alternative title Forever Yours. The film was made at Isleworth Studios. It is a remake of a 1935 German film of the same title and one of four remakes of foreign-language films made by London Films. The film was not generally well-received by critics, although they praised Gigli's singing.

Plot
While travelling with her employer on an ocean liner, secretary Helen Carleton falls in love with a member of the crew. However, on arriving in New York City, his catty ex-girlfriend convinces Helen that he doesn't really love her. On the rebound, she meets Italian opera singer Enzo Curti and accepts his offer of marriage. A year later, she arrives with Enzo and his young son in London as part of a world tour and meets her former lover, who appeals to her to escape with him.

Cast
 Beniamino Gigli as Enzo Curti 
 Joan Gardner as Helen Carleton  
 Ivan Brandt as Hugh Anderson  
 Jeanne Stuart as Olga Desmond 
 Richard Gofe as Benvenuto Curti  
 Hugh Wakefield as Mr. Jackson  
 Charles Carson as George Arnold  
 Allan Jeayes as London theatre manager  
 Hay Petrie as New York theatre manager

References

Bibliography
 Kulik, Karol. Alexander Korda: The Man Who Could Work Miracles. Virgin Books, 1990.
 Low, Rachael. Filmmaking in 1930s Britain. George Allen & Unwin, 1985.
 Wood, Linda. British Films, 1927-1939. British Film Institute, 1986.

External links

1936 films
British musical drama films
British black-and-white films
1930s musical drama films
Films directed by Zoltán Korda
Films shot at Isleworth Studios
British remakes of German films
Films produced by Alexander Korda
British films set in New York City
Films set in London
Seafaring films
1936 drama films
1930s English-language films
United Artists films
1930s British films